Ron Ellis is a filmmaker known for his work dealing with intellectual disability.

Biography
In 1980, Ellis won an Academy Award (with Sarah Pillsbury) for Best Short Film, Live Action for Board and Care, a love story involving two young people who have Down Syndrome.

References

External links

American film directors
Directors of Live Action Short Film Academy Award winners
Year of birth missing (living people)
Living people